Herbert Trantow (1903–1993) was a German composer of film scores, active during the postwar era. Before 1950 he worked for DEFA in East Germany, but then worked exclusively in the West. He was the father of the actress Cordula Trantow.

Selected filmography
 Wozzeck (1947)
 Girls Behind Bars (1949)
 Five Suspects (1950)
 A Rare Lover (1950)
 The Staircase (1950)
 The Sinful Border (1951)
 Shadow over the Islands (1952)
 Towers of Silence (1952)
 Big City Secret (1952)
 A Thousand Red Roses Bloom (1952)
 All Clues Lead to Berlin (1952)
 Come Back (1953)
 Annaluise and Anton (1953)
 On the Reeperbahn at Half Past Midnight (1954)
 Love Without Illusions (1955)
 I Was an Ugly Girl (1955)
 Sacred Lie (1955)
 The Story of Anastasia (1956)
 The Night of the Storm (1957)
 Heaven, Love and Twine (1960)
 Until Money Departs You (1960)
 Lana, Queen of the Amazons (1964)

References

Bibliography 
 Fritsche, Maria. Homemade Men in Postwar Austrian Cinema: Nationhood, Genre and Masculinity. Berghahn Books, 2013.

External links 
 

1903 births
1993 deaths
Musicians from Dresden
German film score composers